The Honda ZR-V (also known as Honda HR-V in North America and China) is an automobile produced by Honda. It is a compact crossover SUV (C-segment) positioned between the global market HR-V/Vezel/XR-V and the CR-V. The vehicle shares its platform with the eleventh-generation Civic.

The development of the ZR-V was led by model development manager Shuichi Ono. It was first unveiled in the United States on April 4, 2022 as the third-generation HR-V differentiated from the global model, in order to "meet the distinct needs of U.S. customers". Sales started in that market on June 7, 2022 for the 2023 model year. Later launches such as in China and Europe utilized the "ZR-V" nameplate as it is sold alongside the global HR-V in these markets. Chinese models are produced by both Guangqi Honda as the ZR-V and Dongfeng Honda as the HR-V respectively. European models will use full hybrid powertrain as standard.

According to Honda, the name "ZR-V" stands for "Z Runabout Vehicle", a reference to the Generation Z.

Markets

Japan 
The Japanese market ZR-V was announced in July 2022, which indirectly replaced the CR-V. It is powered by either a 1.5-liter turbocharged gasoline engine or a 2.0-liter e:HEV hybrid powertrains. Japanese sales began on September 8.

China 
The Chinese market ZR-V was unveiled in May 2022. Produced by Guangqi Honda, the model is powered by a 1.5-liter turbocharged gasoline engine. A version produced by Dongfeng Honda was launched in February 2023 as the HR-V.

North America 
The model went on sale in North America as the HR-V on June 7, 2022 for the 2023 model year. Grade levels offered are LX, Sport, and EX-L. North American models are produced in Celaya, Mexico.

Gallery

Sales

References

External links 

  (Japan)
 Official press release (Europe)

ZR-V
Cars introduced in 2022
Compact sport utility vehicles
Crossover sport utility vehicles
Front-wheel-drive vehicles
All-wheel-drive vehicles
Hybrid sport utility vehicles
Partial zero-emissions vehicles
Vehicles with CVT transmission